The State Printing Agency (SPA) is a Somaliland government agency established in 1997 by President Mohamed Haji Ibrahim Egal, it is responsible for publishing official documents of the various government agencies of Somaliland.
The Manager who serves as the head of the SPA, is appointed by the President. The current Manager is Mohamoud Rageh Mohamed.

See also
Ali Said Raygal
Politics of Somaliland
Media of Somaliland

References

Government agencies of Somaliland
State publishers
Government agencies established in 1997
1997 establishments in Somaliland